Edward McMahon was a Scottish professional football inside forward who played in the Scottish League for Cowdenbeath. He also played in the Football League for Clapton Orient.

References 

1885 births
Date of death missing
Scottish footballers
English Football League players
Scottish Football League players
Cowdenbeath F.C. players
Brentford F.C. players
Bathgate F.C. players
Portsmouth F.C. players
York City F.C. (1908) players
Southern Football League players
Association football inside forwards
Leyton Orient F.C. players
AFC Bournemouth players